Giedrė is a Lithuanian feminine given name and may refer to:

GiedRé (full name Giedrė Barauskaitė), Lithuanian-French Lithuanian-born singer-songwriter and humorist
Giedrė Beinoriūtė (born 1976), Lithuanian filmmaker, screenwriter, and producer 
Giedrė Dirvanauskaitė, Lithuanian cellist
Giedrė Lukšaitė-Mrázková (born 1944), Lithuanian-Czech musician
Giedrė Voverienė (born 1968), Lithuanian orienteer

Feminine given names
Lithuanian feminine given names